

Qualifiers

Round 1

Round 2

Round 3

Round 4

Round 5

Round 6

Round 7

Million Pound Game

References

2018 in English rugby league